Huanta is a town in Central Peru, capital of the province Huanta in the region Ayacucho.

History                                                     
In the era of the Spanish American wars of independence, Huanta remained loyal to the Spanish monarch Ferdinand VII and the viceroy of Peru designated it the "Loyal and Invincible Villa of Huanta", a source of pride for the residents. Huanta and the province was the site of a major rebellion (1825–28) against the newly formed Peruvian state. The Huanta Rebellion, characterized as a monarchist rebellion, brought together different ethnic and occupational groups in complex interactions.  The peasants of Huanta were originally monarchist rebels and were transformed into liberal guerrillas. Although the rebels were largely illiterate and considered passive and reactionary, recent research argues that they had a clear vision of national politics.  The Huanta rebellion was defeated militarily, but the local leaders did not suffer the severe repression that characterized earlier rebellions, most notably the Rebellion of Túpac Amaru II.

Further reading

Cavero, Luis E. Monografía de la Provincia de Huanta, vol. 1. Lima 1953.
Coronel Aguirre, José. "Don Manuel Jesús Urbina: creación del Colegio de Instrucción Media González Vigil y las pugnas por el Poder Local en Huanta (1910-1930)." In Libro Jubilar, 1933-1983, Comité Central Pro-Bodas de Oro del Colegio Nacional González Vigil. Huanta: Colegio Nacional González Vigil and Universidad Nacional de San Cristóbal de Huamanga.
Husson, Patrick. "Guerre indienne et revolte paysanne dans la province de Huanta (Départament d'Ayacucho-Pérou) au XIXéme siecle." PhD dissertation, Université Paris IV, Sorgonne.
Husson, Patrick. De la Guerra a la Rebelión: Huanta siglo XIX. Cuzco: CBC 1992.
Méndez, Cecilia. The Plebeian Republic: The Huanta Rebellion and the Making of the Peruvian State, 1820-1850. Durham: Duke University Press 2005.

References

Populated places in the Ayacucho Region
History of Peru
Rebellions in South America